Wadikilla is a village (small town/hamlet) located in Jamner taluka of Jalgaon District in Maharashtra, India.

Founded by Shree Hari Parshuram Patil, nearly 100 years ago, Wadikilla has a current population of 325. This village is unique in many senses. Its sibling village Nagan Chauki is located 3 km away from Wadikilla.

Wadikilla is located at higher elevation than Nagan Chauki and other nearby villages. It comes under Sonari Grampanchayat province. Its nearest railway station is Bodvad, Nadgaon.

Villages in Jalgaon district